Albin Walter Norblad Jr. (September 12, 1908 – September 20, 1964), was an American attorney and Republican politician in Oregon. He represented the U.S. state of Oregon's First District from January 18, 1946, until his death from a heart attack in Bethesda, Maryland, on September 20, 1964, in the United States House of Representatives. He was the son of Edna Lyle and A. W. Norblad, Sr., a one-time Governor of Oregon.

Early years
Albin Walter Norblad Jr. was born in Escanaba, Michigan, but, before he was a year old, his family relocated to Astoria, Oregon, where he attended public schools, before completing his secondary studies at the New Mexico Military Academy at Roswell, New Mexico.  A graduate of the University of Oregon, Norblad undertook graduate study at Harvard Law School, and was admitted to the bar in 1932, returning to his hometown of Astoria to practice at his father's firm of Norblad & Norblad.

Political career
Norblad served in the Oregon Legislative Assembly as a representative for one term (1935–1937), was a member of the board of trustees of Linfield College, and a delegate to the 1940 Republican National Convention.  During World War II, he joined the U.S. Air Force, serving as a combat intelligence officer from 1942 to 1945.  Upon return from the war, he settled in Stayton, Oregon, and was elected to fill the vacancy in the United States Congress caused by the death of James W. Mott.  He was re-elected to nine successive terms in the House of Representatives. Norblad voted in favor of the Civil Rights Acts of 1957, 1960, and 1964, as well as the 24th Amendment to the U.S. Constitution.

Death and family
Norblad died of a heart attack in office in Bethesda, Maryland, on September 20, 1964, and was buried in Lone Oak Cemetery in Stayton, Oregon.

One of Norblad's children, Albin W. Norblad III, was a state court judge in Oregon.

See also
 List of United States Congress members who died in office (1950–99)

References

1908 births
1964 deaths
People from Escanaba, Michigan
Harvard Law School alumni
Republican Party members of the Oregon House of Representatives
Oregon lawyers
American people of Swedish descent
University of Oregon alumni
Linfield University people
Politicians from Astoria, Oregon
Republican Party members of the United States House of Representatives from Oregon
People from Stayton, Oregon
20th-century American lawyers
20th-century American politicians